Rush Street is the third studio album by singer and songwriter Richard Marx. Released in late 1991, it sold over two million copies in the United States alone.  It was Richard's third consecutive multi-million seller in the U. S.

Its first single, "Keep Coming Back," was #1 on the American Adult Contemporary chart for four consecutive weeks.  It reached #5 in Cashbox while peaking at #12 in Billboard.  The follow-up single,  "Hazard", also hit #1 Adult Contemporary.  It reached #6 in Cashbox and #9 on the Billboard Hot 100.

Subsequent single releases included "Take This Heart" and "Chains Around My Heart", which were Top Ten hits on the US Adult Contemporary charts.  All four hits boasted popular music videos as well. Toto members Steve Lukather and Jeff Porcaro were among the session musicians employed on the album, although they play on separate tracks.

Marx admitted in 2001 that the track "Superstar" is about Madonna. The album was dedicated to son Brandon Marx and grandmother Lois.

Track listing
 "Playing with Fire" (Richard Marx, Steve Lukather) – 4:29
 "Love Unemotional" (Marx) – 5:06
 "Keep Coming Back" (Marx) – 6:51
 "Take This Heart" (Marx) – 4:10
 "Hazard" (Marx) – 5:17
 "Hands in Your Pocket" (Marx) – 3:54
 "Calling You" (Marx, Bruce Gaitsch) – 4:42
 "Superstar" (Marx) – 4:42
 "Streets of Pain" (Marx, Fee Waybill) – 5:10
 "I Get No Sleep" (Marx) – 3:44
 "Big Boy Now" (Marx, Waybill) – 5:38
 "Chains Around My Heart" (Marx, Waybill) – 5:42
 "Your World" (Marx) – 5:54

Bonus Tracks on Japanese release
 "Ride with the Idol" – 3:46

Bonus Tracks on Latin America release
 "Regresa A Mi [Keep Coming Back]" – 5:22

Personnel 

Musicians
 Richard Marx – arrangements, lead vocals, acoustic piano (11, 12), Fender Rhodes (12), keyboards (12)
 Michael Egizi – keyboards (3-6, 8, 11, 12, 13), programming (5)
 Greg Phillinganes – Fender Rhodes (3)
 Kim Bullard – keyboards (7)
 Bill Champlin – Hammond B3 organ (8)
 Billy Joel – acoustic piano (10)
 Steve Lukather – guitars (1, 9, 10), guitar solos (1, 9), arrangements (1, 9, 10)
 Bruce Gaitsch – guitars (2, 3, 8, 13), acoustic guitar (5, 12), guitar solo (7), arrangements (7, 13)
 Michael Landau – guitars (4, 6, 13), guitar solo (4, 6, 8, 11, 12), acoustic guitar (12), electric guitar (12), arrangements (13)
 Paul Warren – guitars (11)
 Randy Jackson – bass (1, 9, 10)
 Marcus Miller – bass (2)
 Nathan East – bass (3, 4, 6, 13)
 Jim Cliff – bass (7, 11, 12)
 Leland Sklar – bass (8)
 Jon Clarke – drum programming (1)
 Terry Bozzio – drums (1, 10, 13)
 Jonathan Moffett – drums (2, 3, 4)
 Jeff Porcaro – drums (6, 7, 8, 12), arrangements (8)
 Tommy Lee – drums (9)
 Mike Baird – drums (11)
 Chris Trujillo – percussion (4, 5, 12, 13)
 John "Juke" Logan – harmonica (2)
 Jerry Hey – horn arrangements (2)
 Steve Grove – saxophone (2, 3)
 Lee Thornburg – trombone (2), trumpet (2)

Background vocals
 Tamara Champlin (1, 2, 9)
 Jim Cliff (1)
 Dalbello (1, 2, 9)
 Michael Egizi (1)
 Steve George (1)
 Richard Marx (1, 2, 5-9, 13)
 Richard Page (1)
 Brandy Rosenberg (1)
 Matt Westfield (1)
 John "Juke" Logan (2)
 Luther Vandross (2, 3)
 Janet Gardner (6)
 Ruth Marx (9)
 Fee Waybill (9)
 Cheryl Lynn (10)
 Cindy Mizelle (10)

Production
 Brad Aldredge – assistant engineer
 Bryant Arnett – assistant engineer
 Ray Blair – engineer (6)
 Rick Caughron – assistant engineer
 Lavant Coppock – assistant engineer
 Peter Doell – engineer (5, 7, 12)
 Michael Douglas – assistant engineer
 Bill Drescher – engineer (1-4, 6, 8, 10, 11), mixing (1-7, 10, 12), additional engineer (5)
 Susanne Edgren – production coordination
 Ross Garfield – technician
 Lolly Grodner – assistant engineer
 Mick Guzauski – mixing (8)
 Mark Hagen – assistant engineer
 Nels Israelson – photography
 Brian Jackson – design
 Leslie Ann Jones – assistant engineer
 Jesse Kanner – assistant engineer
 Brian Malouf – mixing (11, 13)
 Pat McDougal – assistant engineer
 Tom Nellen – assistant engineer
 Rick Norman – assistant engineer
 Charles Paakkari – assistant engineer
 Kevin Reeves – assistant engineer
 Mark Stebbeds – assistant engineer
 Wally Traugott – mastering
 Larry Vigon – art direction, design
 Fee Waybill – co-producer (lead vocals; 1, 10)
 Randy Wine – assistant engineer
 Dave Wittman – engineer (Billy Joel; 10)

Charts

Weekly charts

Year-end charts

Certifications

References

1991 albums
Albums produced by Richard Marx
Richard Marx albums
Capitol Records albums
Albums recorded at Henson Recording Studios